Ignacio Berenguer Lleonart (born 9 August 1995) is a Mexican windsurfer. He competed in the 2020 Summer Olympics in the Men's RS:X event.

Notes

References

External links
 
 
 

1995 births
Living people
Mexican male sailors (sport)
Mexican windsurfers
Olympic sailors of Mexico
Sailors at the 2020 Summer Olympics – RS:X
People from Cancún
Sportspeople from Quintana Roo
21st-century Mexican people